Ateyyat El Abnoudy (November 26, 1939 – October 5, 2018), also known as Ateyyat Awad Mahmoud Khalil, was an Egyptian journalist, lawyer, actress, producer, and movie director. She was born in a small village along the Nile Delta in Egypt. El-Abnoudy was considered to be one of the pioneering Arab female movie directors as her films inspired the works of many Arab women in the industry. She has been called the "poor people's filmmaker" due to the subject matter that inspired her to make films, including civil rights issues and the condition of impoverished Arabs.

El Abnoudy has received more than 30 international awards for her 22 films, including three for Horse of Mud, released in 1971.

Early life and education
Ateyyat El Abnoudy was raised in a small village by her two parents in a working-class family. El-Abnoudy attended the University of Cairo to attain her law degree, working as an actress at a local theatre to fund her education. While at university, she met her first husband, a journalist and poet named Abdel-Rahman El Abnoudy. Abdel's career gave Atteyyat access to a network of writers, poets, and other artists in Egypt.

Career
El Abnoudy played various roles at the theater, such as stage manager and assistant. In 1972 she attended the Cairo Higher Institute of Cinema to finish her film studies. While there, she created Horse of Mud, which was not only her first documentary, but also Egypt's first documentary produced by a woman.

El Abnoudy started her acting career as a means to financially support herself in school while she studied journalism. When El-Abnoudy's career as a journalist began, she took a particular interest in the poor of Egypt, specifically Cairo. This later inspired her to take up production and become a filmmaker who shed light on the plight of some in Egypt. El-Abnoudy quickly became known by two titles: the "poor people's filmmaker" and the "mother of documentaries". She inspired many Arab women filmmakers to follow in her footsteps.

El-Abnoudy's films are known for dealing with political, social, and economic issues in Egypt. They challenged the censored state of film during Egypt's Sadat era. El-Abnoudy further contested the censorship of Egypt's filmmakers when she became the first female to establish her own production company, Abnoudy Film, which supported small filmmakers similar to her.

Filmography

Awards and nominations
1971, three international prizes at the Grand Prix Film Festival, Mannheim Film Festival and Damascus Film Festival. 
 1972, French Critics Prize at Grenoble Film Festival.
1990, Best Co-Production Prize, Valencia Film Festival, Spain.
1992, Egyptian Film Critics Prize, Ismailia International Documentary & Short Film Festival.
1998, Honoured, National Film Festival, Egyptian Ministry of Culture.

References

Additional Readings 
The Physicalities of Documentaries by African Women written by Stefanie Van De Peer

Permissible Documentaries: Representation in Ateyyat El Abnoudy's documentaries written by Stefanie Van De Peer

Popular Egyptian Cinema: Gender, Class, and Nation written by Viola Shafik

External links 
 
 1993 Ateyyat El-Abnoudy interview with Kevin Thomas
 Ateyyat El Abnoudy Interview with Rebecca Hillauer

1939 births
2018 deaths
Egyptian women journalists
Egyptian women lawyers
Egyptian women film directors
Egyptian film actresses
Egyptian film directors
Civil rights activists
Egyptian documentary filmmakers
Egyptian film producers
Women documentary filmmakers
Cairo Higher Institute of Cinema alumni